The Rutaceae is a family, commonly known as the rue or citrus family, of flowering plants, usually placed in the order Sapindales.

Species of the family generally have flowers that divide into four or five parts, usually with strong scents. They range in form and size from herbs to shrubs and large trees.

The most economically important genus in the family is Citrus, which includes the orange (C. × sinensis), lemon (C. × limon), grapefruit (C. × paradisi), and lime (various, mostly C. aurantifolia, the key lime). Boronia is a large Australian genus, some members of which are plants with highly fragrant flowers and are used in commercial oil production. Other large genera include Zanthoxylum, several species of which are cultivated for Sichuan pepper, Melicope, and Agathosma. About 160 genera are in the family Rutaceae.

Characteristics 
Most species are trees or shrubs, a few are herbs (the type genus Ruta, Boenninghausenia and Dictamnus), frequently aromatic with glands on the leaves, sometimes with thorns. The leaves are usually opposed and compound, and without stipules. Pellucid glands, a type of oil gland, are found in the leaves responsible for the aromatic smell of the family's members; traditionally they have been the primary synapomorphic characteristic to identify the Rutaceae.

Flowers are bractless, solitary or in cyme, rarely in raceme, and mainly pollinated by insects. They are radially or (rarely) laterally symmetric, and generally hermaphroditic. They have four or five petals and sepals, sometimes three, mostly separate, eight to ten stamen (five in Skimmia, many in Citrus), usually separate or in several groups. Usually a single stigma with 2 to 5 united carpels, sometimes ovaries separate but styles combined.

The fruit of the Rutaceae are very variable: berries, drupes, hesperidia, samaras, capsules, and follicles all occur. Seed number also varies widely.

Taxonomy 
The family is closely related to the Sapindaceae, Simaroubaceae, and Meliaceae, and all are usually placed into the same order, although older systems separate that order into Rutales and Sapindales. The families Flindersiaceae and Ptaeroxylaceae are sometimes kept separate, but nowadays generally are placed in the Rutaceae, as are the former Cneoraceae.

Subfamilies
In 1896, Engler published a division of the family Rutaceae into seven subfamilies. One, Rhabdodendroideae, is no longer considered to belong to the Rutaceae, being treated as the segregate family Rhabdodendraceae, containing only the genus Rhabdodendron. Two monogeneric subfamilies, Dictyolomatoideae and Spathelioideae, are now included in the subfamily Cneoroideae, along with genera Engler placed in other families. The remaining four Engler subfamilies were Aurantioideae, Rutoideae, Flindersioideae and Toddalioideae. Engler's division into subfamilies largely relied on the characteristics of the fruit, as did others used until molecular phylogenetic methods were applied.

Molecular methods have shown that only Aurantioideae can be clearly differentiated from other members of the family based on fruit. They have not supported the circumscriptions of Engler's three other main subfamilies. In 2012, Groppo et al. divided Rutaceae into only two subfamilies, retaining Cneoroideae but placing all the remaining genera in a greatly enlarged subfamily Rutoideae s.l. A 2014 classification by Morton and Telmer also retained Engler's Aurantioideae, but split the remaining Rutoideae s.l. into a smaller Rutoideae and a much larger Amyridoideae s.l., containing most of Engler's Rutoideae. Until 2021, molecular phylogenetic methods had only sampled between 20% and 40% of the genera of Rutaceae. A 2021 study by Appelhans et al. sampled almost 90% of the genera. The two main clades recognized by Groppo et al. in 2012 were upheld, but Morton and Telmer's Rutoideae was paraphyletic and their Amyridoideae was polyphyletic and did not include the type genus. Applehans et al. divided the family into six subfamilies, shown below in the cladogram produced in their study. The large subfamily Zanthoxyloideae was shown to contain distinct clades, but the authors considered that a revised classification at the tribal level was not yet feasible at the time their paper was published.

Notable species 

The family is of great economic importance in warm temperate and subtropical climates for its numerous edible fruits of the genus Citrus, such as the orange, lemon, calamansi, lime, kumquat, mandarin and grapefruit.

Non-citrus fruits include the white sapote (Casimiroa edulis), orangeberry (Glycosmis pentaphylla), limeberry (Triphasia trifolia), and the bael (Aegle marmelos).

The curry tree, Murraya koenigii, is of culinary importance in the Indian subcontinent and elsewhere, as its leaves are used as a spice to flavour dishes. Spices are also made from a number of species in the genus Zanthoxylum, notably Sichuan pepper.

Other plants are grown in horticulture: Murraya and Skimmia species, for example. Ruta, Zanthoxylum and Casimiroa species are medicinals. Several plants are also used by the perfume industry, such as the Western Australian Boronia megastigma.

The genus Pilocarpus has species (P. jaborandi, and P. microphyllus from Brazil, and P. pennatifolius from Paraguay) from which the medicine pilocarpine, used to treat glaucoma, is extracted.

References

External links 

 
Sapindales families